Michael Leo Howell (6 July 1946 – 25 December 1985) was an Australian rules footballer who played with North Melbourne in the Victorian Football League (VFL).

Notes

External links 		
		
		
		
		
		
		
		
1946 births		
1985 deaths		
Australian rules footballers from Victoria (Australia)		
North Melbourne Football Club players